Shrewsbury is the county town of Shropshire.  It contains many listed buildings, which have been divided into three lists.

Listed buildings in Shrewsbury (northwest central area)
Listed buildings in Shrewsbury (southeast central area)
Listed buildings in Shrewsbury (outer areas)

Lists of buildings and structures in Shropshire
Buildings and structures in Shrewsbury